Jungle Adventurer is an Italian adventure film. It starred Richard Harrison.

The film is loosely based on Emilio Salgari's 1902 adventure novel La montagna di luce (The Mountain of Light), which narrates a fictitious attempt to steal the priceless Koh-i-Noor diamond, concocted in 19th-century India by the Thuggee and the dacoits. The original Italian title of both the film and the source novel refers to the name of the jewel.

The film was re-released under several alternate titles, one of which, Sandok, was an attempt to capitalize on the popularity of Salgari's fictional pirate Sandokan, even though neither the novel, nor the film had anything to do with Sandokan's character or the settings of his adventures.

Cast
Richard Harrison as Alan Foster
Luciana Gilli as	Lilamani
Wilbert Bradley as	Sitama
Daniele Vargas as	Rajah Sindar
Andrea Scotti
Nerio Bernardi
Giovanni Cianfriglia as Sergeant
Nazzareno Zamperla as Sitama's Man #1
Dakar as Sitama's Man #2

Reception
From contemporary reviews, an anonymous reviewer in the Monthly Film Bulletin reviewed a dubbed 87 minute version of the film. The reviewer noted that Malaysian locations were put to good use for the film, and that it "is treated lightly enough to seem a good deal less corny than its well-worn theme." The reviewer found Richard Harrison (actor) as "an adequate hero" while Wilbert Bradley was "as superbly gleeful rogue."

References

External links
 

Italian adventure films
1960s Italian-language films
1960s adventure films
Films based on works by Emilio Salgari
Films directed by Umberto Lenzi
1960s Italian films